Alipur, aka Goth Alipur, is a village and deh in Bulri Shah Karim taluka of Tando Muhammad Khan District, Sindh. As of 2017, it has a population of 3,451, in 676 households. It is the seat of a tapedar circle, which also includes the villages of Qabool Pur, Raitishore, Sonhari, and Soomra.

References 

Populated places in Tando Muhammad Khan District